The 1980 Bavarian Tennis Championships was a men's Grand Prix tennis circuit tournament played on outdoor clay courts at the MTTC Iphitos in Munich, West Germany. It was the 64th edition of the tournament and was held from 20 May through 25 May 1980. Rolf Gehring won the singles title.

Finals

Singles

 Rolf Gehring defeated  Christophe Freyss 6–2, 0–6, 6–2, 6–2
 It was Gehring's only title of the year and the 1st of his career.

Doubles

 Heinz Günthardt /  Bob Hewitt defeated  David Carter /  Chris Lewis 7–6, 6–1
 It was Günthardt's 4th title of the year and the 8th of his career. It was Hewitt's 1st title of the year and the 57th of his career.

References

External links 
 ATP tournament profile
 

Bavarian Tennis Championships
 
Bavarian International Tennis Championships
Bavarian Tennis Championships
Bavarian Tennis Championships
German